Tapton may refer to:

Buildings in England
Tapton House, a late 18th-century country house, now part of Chesterfield College, Tapton, Derbyshire
Tapton Hall of Residence, one of the halls owned by the University of Sheffield
Tapton School, of Sheffield
Tapton Hall, a listed building in the Crosspool area of Sheffield

Places in England
Tapton, Derbyshire
Tapton Hill, a district in Broomhill and Sharrow Vale, South Yorkshire

Other uses
John Tapton, Dean of St Asaph from 1463 until 1493